John Thomas Emmons (born August 17, 1974) is an American former professional ice hockey center who played in the National Hockey League for the Ottawa Senators, Tampa Bay Lightning and the Boston Bruins between 1999 and 2002. Emmons was born in San Jose, California, but grew up in New Canaan, Connecticut.

Playing career

He also had a spell in Germany's Deutsche Eishockey Liga with Eisbären Berlin in 2002–2003.  Drafted 122nd overall by the Calgary Flames in the 1993 NHL Entry Draft, Emmons played 85 games in the NHL and scored 2 goals and 4 assists for 6 points and picking up 64 penalty minutes.

Personal life

Emmons currently resides in Washington, Michigan.

Career statistics

External links
 

1974 births
American men's ice hockey centers
Boston Bruins players
Calgary Flames draft picks
Dayton Bombers players
Detroit Vipers players
Eisbären Berlin players
Fort Wayne Komets players
Grand Rapids Griffins players
Ice hockey players from California
Ice hockey players from Connecticut
Kalamazoo Wings (1974–2000) players
Living people
Ottawa Senators players
People from New Canaan, Connecticut
Providence Bruins players
Sportspeople from San Jose, California
Tampa Bay Lightning players
Yale Bulldogs men's ice hockey players